Pani is a surname in India.

Pani or PANI may also refer to:
 Pawnee people, a Native American tribe, is sometimes spelled this way
 Polyaniline, a polymer
 Aniak Airport, Aniak, Alaska, United States (ICAO airport code: PANI)

See also
 Panis (disambiguation)
 Panini (disambiguation)